The Wicked Buddah Baby is the debut solo studio album by American rapper 3-2, a member of Blac Monks and Screwed Up Click, from Houston, Texas. It was released on September 17, 1996, via Rap-A-Lot Records and Noo Trybe Records. It features guest appearances from 8Ball & MJG, Sonia Moore, Southside Playaz, Too Short and UGK. The album peaked at number 28 on the US Billboard Top R&B/Hip-Hop Albums chart and number 13 on the Heatseekers Albums chart.

Track listing 

Sampled credits
 "Dressed 2 Kill" contains elements from "The Memory" by Roy Ayers Ubiquity
 "My Sweet Trick" contains elements from "Juicy Fruit" by Mtume and "Love T.K.O." by Teddy Pendergrass
 "Them Against Me" contains elements from "Electric Lady" by Con Funk Shun
 "Hit the Highway" contains elements from "Just Roll" by Fabu

Personnel 

Christopher Juel Barriere – main artist, producer (track 9), engineering, mixing, mastering, production coordinator, art design
Sonia Moore – featured artist (track 2)
Southside Playaz – featured artists (track 7)
Marlon Jermaine Goodwin – featured artist (track 9)
Premro Smith – featured artist (track 9)
Todd Anthony Shaw – featured artist (track 9)
Bernard Freeman – featured artist (track 10)
Chad Lamont Butler – featured artist (track 10)
John Okuribido – producer (tracks: 1, 3-5), engineering, mixing, mastering, production coordinator, art design, executive producer, management
Michael George Dean – producer (track 7), co-producer (tracks: 1, 3-5), engineering, mixing, mastering
Joseph Johnson – producer (tracks: 2, 6)
Troy Clark – producer (track 8), engineering
John "Swift" Catalon – producer (track 10)
Simon Cullins – producer (track 11)
Freddie Young – producer (track 12)
James A. Smith – executive producer
Jeff Griffin – engineering
Anthony Valcic – mastering
Pen & Pixel – art direction

Charts

References

External links 

1996 debut albums
Rap-A-Lot Records albums
Albums produced by N.O. Joe
Albums produced by Mike Dean (record producer)
3-2 albums